Changsha Evening News ( pinyin:Zhǎngshā wǎnbào) was founded by Changsha Evening News Press Group on July 1, 1956, is one of the municipal newspapers in Changsha City, Hunan Province of China. It is a 24 pages broadsheet newspaper. It became the first newspaper in Hunan Province to achieve double-sided color printing since August 2004. To promote media integration, Changsha Evening News has become a "resource sharing" for media creative products and technological innovation and upgrading.

Overview 
On April 25, 1956, the Changsha Evening News published its first photo of Changsha. It was founded on July 1, 1956, originally called Changsha Daily. In January 1961, "Changsha Daily" was changed to "Changsha Evening News". It was interrupted during the Cultural Revolution. In 1978, "Changsha Evening News" was republished as "Changsha Daily", and on October 1, 1981, the name of "Changsha Evening News" was restored again. On June 30, 2003, the newspaper named the K517/518 train from Changsha to Shenzhen (now the K9017/9018 train) as the "Changsha Evening News". This is the first time that Hunan Media has named a transportation vehicle.

See also
 List of magazines in China
 List of newspapers in China
 History of newspapers and magazines#China
 Chinese tabloid
 Media in the People's Republic of China

References

Chinese-language newspapers
1956 establishments in China
Furong District